The Moromete Family is a 1987 Romanian drama film based on the first volume of the eponymous novel by Marin Preda.A sequel  was filmed in 2017.

The movie, as well as its sequel, were shot in Talpa, Teleorman County.

Cast 
 Victor Rebengiuc – Ilie Moromete
 Luminița Gheorghiu – Catrina Moromete
  – Guica
 Dorel Vișan – Tudor Bălosu
 Mitică Popescu – Cocoșilă
  – Aristide
 Florin Zamfirescu – Țugurlan
  – Ilinca
  – Nilă
  – Aristița
  – Polina
  – Dumitru
  – Ion
  – Iocan
  – police chief
  – Constantin
 
 Mihai Gruia Sandu – Bâldii
 Mircea Florin Anca
  – Voicu
  – Teodorescu

References

External links 

1987 drama films
1987 films
Romanian drama films